The King's Head and Eight Bells is a Grade II listed former public house at 50 Cheyne Walk, Chelsea, London SW3, United Kingdom.

It was built in the early 19th century.

It is now a restaurant, the Cheyne Walk Brasserie.

The King's Head and Eight Bells was Dylan Thomas's favourite pub in the early 1940s during the second world war.

References

Grade II listed buildings in the Royal Borough of Kensington and Chelsea
Grade II listed pubs in London
Pubs in the Royal Borough of Kensington and Chelsea
Chelsea, London